Macarius of Corinth (. birth name: Michael Notaras) was born in Corinth in 1731 and died in Chios in April 1805. Macarius as Metropolitan bishop of Corinth, was a mystic and spiritual writer who worked to revive and mostly sustain the Eastern Orthodox Church under Turkish rule. He is most famous for working with Nicodemus of the Holy Mountain in collecting and compiling the ascetic text of the Philokalia.

Prayer of the Heart
With his friend Nicodemus, Makarios compiled the five tomes of the Philokalia that were first published in Venice in 1782. It was the publication of these sacred and spiritual texts that lead to a renewal of the hesychast movement within Eastern Orthodox.

Beauty shall save the World

The term used Philokalia (love of the beautiful) for the texts, was to enshrine the history of the Jesus Prayer (the Prayer of the heart) and the spiritual practice of this is called Hesychasm. It is this love of beauty that revives and gives faith to the hopeless. The history of the prayer begins with its earliest fathers including Anthony the Great and the text ends with Gregory Palamas. The title conveys the contemplative tradition, in that it teaches understanding of the inner or mystical Kingdom of God within each person. The spirit of God is an ember, one must cultivate the ember into an open fire. This perpetual fire burns in the heart, in love for all things, which is to share in the energy of God, which is love. It is within the Philokalia that one learns how to properly navigate through the passions and depravity of existence called the World. The object of contemplation being "the love of beauty" or infinite beauty which is God. For if existence was truly evil it could not contain nor express beauty. This expression conveys the truth about the divine (ascetic) life and purpose which the heart learns through practice of the Prayer, which is called Hesychasm. God in his energies is love. It is this beauty, the Russian philosophers held, that would "will save the World".

See also
Theosis (Eastern Orthodox theology)
Theoria
Ritual purification
Praxis
Sacred Heart as a Catholic doctrine of devotion.

References

Hesychasts
1731 births
1805 deaths
Greek Christians
Greek theologians
Saints of Ottoman Greece
Orthodox bishops of Corinth
Greek saints of the Eastern Orthodox Church
Philokalia